LRMT may refer to:

 Lahore Rapid Mass Transit System, a planned transit system in Pakistan
 Light Rail and Modern Tramway, a monthly international magazine published in the United Kingdom